Howard A. Knutson (May 16, 1929 – October 1, 2006) was an American lawyer and politician.

Knutson was born in Grand Forks, North Dakota and grew up in Glencoe, Minnesota with his family. He served in the United States Army from 1951 to 1953. Knutson graduated from Luther College, in Decorah, Iowa, in 1951, and from William Mitchell College of Law in 1959. He lived in Burnsville, Minnesota with his wife and family and practiced law in Burnsville. Knutson served in the Minnesota House of Representatives from 1967 to 1982 and in the Minnesota Senate from 1973 to 1990. He was a Republican. Knutson died from Alzheimer's disease and from cancer at his home in Burnsville, Minnesota. His son David Knutson also served in the Minnesota Legislature.

Notes

1929 births
2006 deaths
Politicians from Grand Forks, North Dakota
People from Burnsville, Minnesota
People from Glencoe, Minnesota
Military personnel from Minnesota
Luther College (Iowa) alumni
William Mitchell College of Law alumni
Minnesota lawyers
Republican Party members of the Minnesota House of Representatives
Republican Party Minnesota state senators
Deaths from cancer in Minnesota
Neurological disease deaths in Minnesota
Deaths from Alzheimer's disease
20th-century American politicians
20th-century American lawyers